Anup Dave (born 2 May 1981) is an Indian first-class cricketer who represented Rajasthan. He made his first-class debut for Rajasthan in the 1998-99 Ranji Trophy on 23 February 1999.

References

External links
 

1981 births
Living people
Indian cricketers
Rajasthan cricketers